Glenea posticata is a species of beetle in the family Cerambycidae. It was described by Charles Joseph Gahan in 1895. It is known from Myanmar and Laos.

References

posticata
Beetles described in 1895